Marcus Wicker is an American poet. He won the 2011 National Poetry Series Prize for his collection Maybe the Saddest Thing and a 2014 Pushcart Prize for his poem "Interrupting Aubade Ending In Epiphany".  He teaches creative writing in the MFA program at the University of Memphis.

Early life and education
Wicker has described taking to writing at an early age, beginning with mystery stories and personal journals in elementary school and then encountering poetry thanks to his tenth grade English teacher who took his class to the National Youth Poetry Slam at the University of Michigan. Seeing students his own age perform their writing encouraged Wicker to pursue his own work. He earned an MFA from Indiana University in 2010.

Career
Wicker's debut collection Maybe the Saddest Thing won the 2011 National Poetry Series Prize, selected by D.A. Powell. The 79-page collection, published with Harper Perennial, was also a nominee for the NAACP Image Award for Literary Work - Poetry. Reviewing the book in Slate, Jonathan Farmer wrote, "In both sound and sense, Wicker nails the terrible courage of standing out and dignifies it with an abrupt austerity." In Muzzle Magazine, Kendra DeColo said the collection "celebrates the messy and uncomfortable," offering "Failure [as] a sacred contract, giving us permission to enter the poems as imperfect beings, to stumble as we question and interact with issues the poems explore."

In 2011, Wicker was a Ruth Lilly Fellow. He won a 2014 Pushcart Prize for his poem, "Interrupting Aubade Ending In Epiphany", originally published in the Southern Indiana Review (Spring 2012), and the Missouri Review'''s 2016 Miller Audio Prize Contest for his poem "Watch us Elocute", originally published in the Boston Review.

Wicker's second collection, Silencer'', appeared with Houghton Mifflin Harcourt on September 5, 2017.

In 2012, Wicker began teaching English at the University of Southern Indiana. He is now on the creative writing faculty in the MFA program at the University of Memphis.

References

External links
 Official site
 Maybe the Saddest Thing at HarperCollins

21st-century American poets
Indiana University Bloomington alumni
Living people
Year of birth missing (living people)
University of Memphis faculty
African-American poets
American male poets
21st-century American male writers
21st-century African-American writers
African-American male writers